is a member of the Japanese Communist Party serving in the House of Representatives. He is opposed to the policy that increases competitive research funds while cutting grants to post-secondary educational institutions, saying that the policy has forced some institutions to hire retired government officials.

References

Living people
Japanese communists
Japanese Communist Party politicians
Members of the House of Representatives (Japan)
Year of birth missing (living people)